Ny Kongensgade 9 is a Neoclassical property located in the small Frederiksholm Neighborhood of central Copenhagen, Denmark. It consists of a three-storey building with mansard roof from 1804 towards the street, a six-bay side wing along the eastern margin of a courtyard and an older two-storey building at its rear. The building from 1804 with its six-bay side wing, was listed in the Danish registry of protected buildings and places in 1904. The low building in the courtyard is not listed.

History

18th century

The property was listed in Copenhagen's first cadastre of 1689 as No. 293 in the city's West Quarter. It was owned by a blacksmith named Svendsen, employed at the Arsenal. The property was listed in the new cadastre of 1756 as No. 337. It was owned by stone mason Jacot Bortling at that time.

19th century
The present building on the site was constructed in 1804 for Christian Nicolai Lautrup (1764–1817). His property was listed in the new cadastre of 1806 as No. 232. Another son, Jørgen Hjort Lautrup, would become Bishop of Lolland-Falster.

Notable 19th century residents include the politician Frederik Moltke (1811–1813 and again 1825–1830), actor and stage director Frederik Schwarz (1822), engineer Ludwig A. Colding (mid-1840s), politician Iver Johan Unsgaard (1857–1858), politician Ludvig Nicolaus von Scheele (first floor, ?–1874), art historian Julius Lange (mid-1870s), painter Carl Bloch (first floor, 1879–1881) and painter and illustrator Lorenz Frølich (1899 –  1904).

2+th century
Sophus Falck was a resident in the building from 1910 and opened the first Falck station in a building in the courtyard (No. 9C). The company had until then been based at No. 15 in the same street. Falck left the premises just five years later when the transition from horse-drawn vehicles to automobiles made the location impractical. The building in the courtyard was then left empty for a while. It was taken over in 1941 by the Danish chapter of the Templars of Honor and Temperance. They occupied the building until 2015.

Architecture

Ny Kongensgade 9 consists of three storeys over a walk-out basement. The facade is dressed in a pale sand colour over a black-painted plinth. The mansard roof is clad with black-glazed tiles towards the street and has a dentillated cornice. The three central bays are accentuated by a median risalit with four giant order Ionic pilasters on the upper floors. The pilasters are supported by a band with acanthus decorations, the latter of which were added in 1854. Between the pilasters runs a sill cornice below the windows on the second floor. The two outer bays are wider than the three central ones. Their windows are accentuated by window frames and sills in sandstone and the windows of the bel étage are additionally topped by a pediment. The outer bays of the ground floor are flanked by smooth pilasters. The one to the left (west) is an arch-headed gate. The one to the right (east) features a window and a cellar entrance with a small sandstone canopy. A six-bay side wing extends from the rear side of the building. It adjoins another building which is again connected to a two-storey building at the bottom of the courtyard (No. 9C). The western margin is defined by a half-timbered wall of the side wing at No. 11.

Today
The building is rented out as office space. The low building at No. 9C is rented out as a venue for parties, meetings and other events.

References

External links

 Source
 Official website

Listed residential buildings in Copenhagen
Buildings and structures completed in 1804
1704 establishments in Denmark